Daniel Bernhardt (born 1965) is a Swiss actor.

Daniel Bernhardt also refer to:
Daniel Bernhardt (footballer) (born 1985), German footballer 
Daniel Bernhardt (ice hockey) (born 1996), Swedish ice hockey player